This is a list of the tallest structures in the Czech Republic. The list contains all types of structures, may be incomplete and should be expanded.

Current

Timeline

See also 
 List of tallest structures in Prague
List of tallest buildings in the Czech Republic

References

External links
 http://skyscraperpage.com/diagrams/?searchID=37729462

Czech Rep
Tallest structures